Kozlovka is a rural locality (a village) in Kalininskoye Rural Settlement, Totemsky District, Vologda Oblast, Russia. The population was 12 as of 2002.

Geography 
Kozlovka is located 17 km southwest of Totma (the district's administrative centre) by road. Ignachevo is the nearest rural locality.

References 

Rural localities in Totemsky District